The 1870 Isle of Wight by-election was fought on 10 June 1870. The election occurred as a result of the death of the incumbent MP of the Liberal Party, Sir John Simeon, 3rd Baronet. The Conservative candidate Alexander Baillie-Cochrane was elected over his Liberal opponent by a margin of 35 votes.

References

1870 in England
Politics of the Isle of Wight
1870 elections in the United Kingdom
By-elections to the Parliament of the United Kingdom in Hampshire constituencies
19th century in Hampshire